Luke Thompson (born 4 July 1988) is an English actor. He is best known for his role as Benedict, the second Bridgerton child, in the Netflix period drama Bridgerton (2020–present).

He debuted in 2013 as Lysander in A Midsummer Night's Dream at the Globe Theatre, earning him Ian Charleson and Evening Standard Theatre Award nominations. He also appeared in the BBC One drama In The Club (2014–2016).

Early life and education
Thompson was born in Southampton and brought up in France from the age of two. His father was an engineer and his mother, a teacher. He is one of three children. He attended the Lycée International François-Ier in Fontainebleau, a French school with an Anglophone section, from 1997 to 2005.

Upon returning to England in 2006, Thompson spent a year with the Year Out Drama Company in Stratford-upon-Avon. He studied English and Drama at the University of Bristol and trained at the Royal Academy of Dramatic Art in London, graduating in 2013.

Career
Thompson's first professional theatre role was as Lysander in A Midsummer Night's Dream at the Globe Theatre, Thompson received nominations for an Evening Standard Theatre Award and an Ian Charleson Award. He would also appear in the Globe productions of Blue Stockings as Will Bennett, Julius Caesar as Mark Antony, and The Broken Heart as Ithocles. His other stage roles include James in Tiger Country at the Hampstead Theatre, Orestes in the Oresteia at the Almeida Theatre and Laertes in the 2017 production of Hamlet. Thompson took over the role of Edgar from Jonathan Bailey in the Ian McKellen-starrer King Lear in 2018 after Bailey passed on joining the West End transfer to do the musical Company instead.

From 2014 to 2016, Thompson played Simon in the BBC One drama In the Club. Thompson made his feature film debut with a small role as a warrant officer in Christopher Nolan's 2017 World War II film Dunkirk. He played Peter Hain in Misbehaviour, a film about Miss World 1970. In 2019, Thompson was cast as Benedict, the second eldest Bridgerton sibling, in the 2020 Shondaland-produced Netflix period drama Bridgerton, an adaptation of the novels by Julia Quinn.

As of 2023, Thompson plays Willem in the English-language stage adaptation of A Little Life, first at Richmond Theatre before transferring to the Harold Pinter Theatre on the West End. He is set to appear in the World War II miniseries Transatlantic, also on Netflix.

Filmography

Film

Television

Stage

Audio

Awards and nominations

References

External links 
 
 Luke Thompson at Spotlight

Living people
1988 births
Alumni of RADA
Alumni of the University of Bristol
English male radio actors
English male Shakespearean actors
English male stage actors
People from Fontainebleau
Male actors from Southampton